Elena Bellò (born 18 January 1997) is an Italian middle distance runner specialized in the 800 m, her best result at the international senior level was second place at the 2021 European Team Championships in Silesia. She won five national titles at senior level. She competed at the 2020 Summer Olympics, in 800 m.

Career
At international youth level she won gold medal at the 2018 Mediterranean Athletics U23 Championships. She was 7th, before those excluded from the final, at the 2021 European Athletics Championships.

Achievements

National titles
Bellò won six national championships at individual senior level.

Italian Athletics Championships
800 m: 2020, 2021 (2)
Italian Athletics Indoor Championships
800 m: 2018, 2019, 2020, 2021 (4)

See also
 Italian all-time top lists - 800 m

References

External links
 

1997 births
Living people
Italian female middle-distance runners
Athletics competitors of Fiamme Azzurre
Italian Athletics Championships winners
People from Schio
Athletes (track and field) at the 2020 Summer Olympics
Olympic athletes of Italy
Sportspeople from the Province of Vicenza
20th-century Italian women
21st-century Italian women